Robert George Stevenson (August 6, 1877 – January 19, 1949) was an American football coach and college faculty member. He served as the head football coach at Northern Arizona University, then known as Northern Arizona Normal School, in 1923, compiling a record of 6–1.

Stevenson died in 1949.

Head coaching record

College football

a

References

External links
 

1877 births
1949 deaths
Northern Arizona Lumberjacks football coaches
Northern Arizona University faculty
James E. Rogers College of Law alumni
University of Wisconsin–Madison alumni
People from Door County, Wisconsin